Portrait Francesco Giamberti is an oil on panel painting by Piero di Cosimo, executed c. 1485, now in the Rijksmuseum in Amsterdam. The background details show the influence of Hugo van der Goes.

Its subject was a legnaioulo or furniture carver who worked for Cosimo the Elder and the Medici and also composed music for them, carving a musical score into the base of one of the pieces of furniture they commissioned from him. He probably also worked for the papacy. He also founded a major Tuscan family of architects and artists who assumed the name Sangallo, possibly after property they owned at the San Gallo gate of Florence - Giuliano da Sangallo and Antonio da Sangallo the Elder were his sons and Antonio da Sangallo the Younger, Bastiano da Sangallo and Francesco da Sangallo were his grandsons. It was Giuliano who commissioned Piero di Cosimo to produce a double portrait of himself and his father, probably using a death mask for the latter.

Sources
http://medicinaybellasartes.blogspot.com/
 V. V. A. A. (2005). Museos del Mundo, Rijksmuseum, pág. 155. Planeta de Agostini. .

References

Paintings in the collection of the Rijksmuseum
Giamberti
Giamberti
1485 paintings
Paintings by Piero di Cosimo